Nyeme Victória Alexandre Costa Nunes (born October 11, 1998) is a Brazilian volleyball player. She is a current member of the Brazil women's national volleyball team.

Clubs 

  Maranhão Vôlei (2013–2014)
  ADC Bradesco (2016–2019)
  Barueri (2019–2021)
  Sesi Vôlei Bauru (2021–2022)
  Minas (2022–)

Awards and honors

Individual

2017 FIVB Volleyball Women's U20 World Championship – Best Libero

External links

World of Volley Profile

References 

1998 births
Living people
Brazilian women's volleyball players
Liberos